Preston School District refers to:
 Preston Joint School District 201 (Idaho)
 Preston Community School District (Iowa)
 Preston Public School (Oklahoma)